Aqeel Ahmed Abbasi (born 16 June 1963) has been Justice of the Sindh High Court since 25 September 2009.

References

1963 births
Living people
Judges of the Sindh High Court
21st-century Pakistani judges